Qaleh-ye Mohammad Ali Khan (also Romanized as Qal‘eh-ye Moḩammad ‘Alī Khān and Qal‘eh Muhammad ‘Ali Khān; also known as Moḩammad ‘Alī Khān) is a village in Hasanabad Rural District, Fashapuyeh District, Ray County, Tehran Province, Iran. At the 2006 census, its population was 65, in 22 families.

References 

Populated places in Ray County, Iran